Therus Küchlin (13 September 1906 – 20 October 1981) was a Dutch footballer. He played in three matches for the Netherlands national football team from 1925 to 1926.

References

External links
 

1906 births
1981 deaths
Dutch footballers
Netherlands international footballers
Place of birth missing
Association footballers not categorized by position